Trudel is a Canadian community in Gloucester County, New Brunswick.

The community is located on the Acadian Peninsula. The community is centred around the intersection of Route 135 and Route 325. Trudel lies about 2 kilometres north of Paquetville

History

Notable people

See also
List of communities in New Brunswick

References

Communities in Gloucester County, New Brunswick